Robinsonia klagesi is a moth in the family Erebidae. It was described by Walter Rothschild in 1910. It is found in French Guiana, Venezuela and Bolivia.

References

Moths described in 1910
Robinsonia (moth)
Arctiinae of South America